Komarówka may refer to the following places in Poland:

Komarówka, Lublin Voivodeship
Komarówka, Pomeranian Voivodeship
Komarówka Podlaska

See also
Komarivka